CJVR-FM is a Canadian radio station broadcasting at 105.1 FM in Melfort, Saskatchewan. Owned by the Jim Pattison Group, the station airs a country format. It is located with sister station CKJH at 611 Main Street.

History
The station received CRTC approval on December 7, 2001 and originally began broadcasting in FM on March 1, 2002. CJVR is currently a sister station of CKJH, which first went on the air in 2002. CJVR originally went to air on October 8, 1966 at 1420 AM. In 1995, CJVR moved to 750 AM, where it remained until March 1, 2002 when it switched to FM.

On November 1, 2018, the Jim Pattison Group acquired Fabmar Communications. The sale made CKJH and CJVR-FM sisters to Jim Pattison Broadcast Group's cluster in Prince Albert.

Rebroadcasters

References

External links
105 CJVR
 

2002 establishments in Saskatchewan
JVR
Jim Pattison Group radio stations
Radio stations established in 2002
JVR